"Too Young" is a song by French rock band Phoenix and is featured on their debut studio album, United. It was the band's first single to chart.

The song has appeared in Shallow Hal and Lost in Translation.

Track listing
 "Too Young" – 3:17
 "Too Young" (Zoot Woman remix) – 3:51
 "Too Young" (Le Knight Club remix) – 4:58

Charts

References

1999 singles
1999 songs
Phoenix (band) songs
Songs written by Thomas Mars
Songs written by Laurent Brancowitz